Balewo  is a village in the administrative district of Gmina Mikołajki Pomorskie, within Sztum County, Pomeranian Voivodeship, in northern Poland.

Before 1772 the area was part of Kingdom of Poland, 1772-1945 Prussia and Germany. For the history of the region, see History of Pomerania.

The village has a population of 170.

References

Balewo